Sorin is a Romanian masculine name that originates from the noun soare, which means "Sun".  Sorin is common as a given name, but it also exists as a surname.  People with the given name include:

 Sorin Antohi
 Sorin Bottez
 Sorin Chifiriuc
 Sorin Frunză
 Sorin Ghionea
 Sorin Iodi
 Sorin Lavric
 Sorin Lerescu
 Sorin Matei
 Sorin Oprescu
 Sorin Paraschiv
 Sorin Popa
 Sorin Rădoi
 Sorin Socol

See also
 Sorin (disambiguation)

References

Given names
Masculine given names
Romanian masculine given names